Balāde par gulbi is a song by Latvian Rock band Pērkons, written by Māris Melgalvis (lyrics) and Juris Kulakovs (music) in 1979 and recorded in 1983. Written while Latvia was still part of USSR, it is noted for its anti-soviet subtext. The opening part of the song deals with a crow with no sense of humor sitting on a fresh grave and forcing her opinion on everyone. However, after some time, the crow begins to sense something odd about the grave and relives her own tragedy. It is not until the end, when the crow has had enough of the bitter silence, that she realizes what has happened to her and that the crow is "the woman she loves".
Most of the song dwells on the stupidity of killing a swan, but in the end resolves that the swan is so red that one cannot help killing it (consider that in the early 1980s soviet leaders were dying one after another and were usually mourned by broadcasting Tchaikovsky's Swan Lake).

Lyrics 
Kārna vārna
Uz slapa kapa
Man savu patiesību ķērc
Vai tiešām viņa neattapa ka viss tas - tikai joka pēc
Ak vai cik stulbi
Ir nosist gulbi
Bet stulbāk vēl ja vēlāk žēl
Tad ir tik velnišķīgi stulbi—ik rietā sarkans gulbis kvēl
Tik stulbi kvēl
Ka jāsit vēl

Translation:
A skinny crow
On a wet grave
Croaking her truth to me
Didn't she really realize that it all is just for fun?
Oh, how stupid
It is to beat a swan to death
But even more stupid if you regret it later
It is so devilishly stupid—in each sunset a red swan glows
Glows so stupidly
That one has to beat it again

References

Pērkons (band) songs
1979 songs